was an Olympic boxing bronze medalist from Osaka, Japan.

Biography
Morioka won the inter-high school boxing tournament in his senior year, and entered Kinki University. He won the Japanese amateur boxing tournament four years in a row from 1965-1968. He was chosen as a member of the Japanese Olympic team for the 1968 Summer Olympics, and won a bronze medal in the bantamweight division.

He made his professional debut after graduating, but retired after it was discovered that he had suffered a detached retina. His professional record was 6-4-0 (3KOs).

After retiring, he served as the commissioner of the Western Japan Boxing Commission from 1998-2000. He also founded a boxing gym in Kawanishi, Hyogo. He died from cancer in 2004, at 58 years of age.

His nephew, Toshiyuki Morioka, has created a movie based on his life, which was released in Japan in January 2008.

Olympic results
1968 won a bantamweight boxing bronze medal at the Mexico City Olympics. Results were:

Round of 32: Defeated Dominardo Calumarde (Philippines) on points (4-1)
Round of 16: Defeated Aldo Cosentino (France) on points (4-1)
Quarterfinal: Defeated Michael Dowling (Ireland) on points (4-1)
Semifinal: Lost to Valeri Sokolov (Soviet Union) on points (0-5) (was awarded bronze medal)

References

External links

Morioka Boxing Gym

1946 births
2004 deaths
Deaths from cancer in Japan
Bantamweight boxers
Olympic bronze medalists for Japan
Boxers at the 1968 Summer Olympics
Sportspeople from Osaka
Olympic boxers of Japan
Olympic medalists in boxing
Japanese male boxers
Medalists at the 1968 Summer Olympics